Herding sheep may refer to:
the activities of a human shepherd
the activities of a herding dog

See also
sheep#Herding